Fiske & Meginnis, Architects was an architecture firm partnership from 1915–1924 between Ferdinand C. Fiske (1856–1930) and Harry Meginnis in Lincoln, Nebraska. Twelve of the buildings they designed are listed on the National Register of Historic Places (NRHP). The two men have additional buildings listed on the National Register with other partnerships or individually credited.  Related firms were Fiske and Dieman, Fiske, Meginnis and Schaumberg, and Meginnis and Schaumberg.

Ferdinand C. Fiske was born in New York and raised in Iowa. He was educated at Cornell University and moved to Lincoln during the building boom of 1887 and practiced there the rest of his life. He was a founding partner of firms including Fiske & Dieman (1898–1912); Fiske & Miller (1912–1924); and Fiske, Meginnis, & Schaumberg (1924–1925).

Harry Meginnis did not receive an education in architecture but learned through the construction business. He worked under Fiske at Fiske & Dieman (1901–1909) in their Lincoln office as a draftsman. He had brief stints at several firms in Indianapolis including DuPont & Hunter (1907–1909); H.L. Bass Co. (1909–1914); and Broakie & Meginnis (1914–1915). In 1915, Meginnis returned to Lincoln to start Fiske & Meginnis (1915–1924) and Fiske, Meginnis, & Schaumberg (1924–1925). Meginnis went on to establish Meginnis and Schaumberg (1925–1943) with Edward G. Schaumberg. It lasted until Meginnis died in 1943.

While Fiske and his partners worked under many different styles, Fiske & Meginnis mostly worked within the English Revival realm (Elizabethan, Georgian, and Tudor among others) combined with the Prairie style that Frank Lloyd Wright was concerned with at the time. They were also involved in a significant number of industrial warehouse projects in Lincoln, namely in the Haymarket District.

Selected works

Reese House

Located within the Mount Emerald and Capitol Additions District, the Reese House was designed by Fiske and Meginnis in 1907. The Reese House was designed with false-timber work and stucco and large overhanging eaves over the porches placing it into the Tudor-Revival/Prairie-Style category that Fiske & Meginnis were known for especially in their residential projects. This residence was designed for Manoah Bostic Reese and his family who was the chief justice of the Nebraska Supreme Court and also the Dean for the College of Law at the University of Nebraska-Lincoln.

Lincoln Municipal Lighting and Waterworks Building

Though it currently stands as an apartment building, Fiske and Meginnis’ A Street landmark was originally built as the Lincoln Municipal Lighting and Waterworks Plant. Much like many of their other public works together, Fiske and Meginnis designed a building easily classified as neoclassical revival. Three, large, and light blue smoke stacks protrude through the flat roof, while the large structure and exterior facade of the building consists of a slightly darker red brick, trimmed with limestone and buff bricks on the cornices. The focal east and north facades are punctured with what appears to be two stories of large glass windows with round heads. But behind this deceptive façade lies a factory-like interior, renovated into apartments. The large first floor and first floor windows leave room for an attic floor above.

Antelope Grocery

Built in 1922, Antelope grocery was constructed as a mixed use (commercial and apartment) building. The two-story brick and stucco structure makes use of architectural elements common to period houses. The store includes a visual usage of Tudor revival-styled elements within the construction and has undergone multiple renovations while retaining a high degree of architectural integrity. This includes the current existence of its original metal framed store-front windows. The lower level of the building remains business, while the upper level is mainly residential apartments. As far as the exterior is concerned, stucco and half-timber form the cladding which traces up to a truncated steeply pitched roof capped with a flat decking. The main modifications to the building's exterior include re roofing and addition of protective glazing over the transoms.

Complete works 
Fiske & Meginnis practiced many styles of architecture, which lead to a wide variety of commissions. The firm designed residences, public works buildings, libraries, schools for all levels of education, and warehouses.

 * buildings in Historic Haymarket District
 ** buildings on the University of Nebraska Lincoln’s campus
 *** houses in Mount Emerald Historic District

References 

Defunct architecture firms based in Nebraska
Design companies established in 1915
History of Lincoln, Nebraska
1915 establishments in Nebraska
Design companies disestablished in 1943
1943 disestablishments in Nebraska